Phytepsin is an enzyme. This enzyme catalyses the following chemical reaction

 Prefers hydrophobic residues Phe, Val, Ile, Leu, and Ala at P1 and P1', but also cleaves -Phe-Asp- and -Asp-Asp- bonds in 2S albumin from plant seeds

This enzyme is present in barley grain and other plants. It is an aspartic protease with a plant-specific insert.

References

External links 
 

EC 3.4.23